A trader's currency token was issued by Samuel Higley of Simsbury, Connecticut in 1737. Higley owned the mine which produced the copper, which was near Granby, Connecticut. He smelted the copper ore, designed and engraved the dies, and struck the tokens himself. They wore out extremely easily, due to the purity of the copper.

Obverse details 
There are three different versions. On all, there is a deer, and some wording. 

Earliest versions were inscribed with 'THE VALUE OF THREE PENSE'.

The second version was inscribed 'VALUE ME AS YOU PLEASE', because so many coins were put into circulation that the "three pence" local value was deflated, and area merchants complained. So, Dr. Higley re-valued the coin, and left it up to the local economy to set its own value.

The third version was inscribed 'THE WHEELE GOES ROUND'.

Reverse details 
The reverse of the coin has three hammers, topped with crowns.

The first coins minted had the word 'Connecticut' on them. Later versions were inscribed 'I AM GOOD COPPER'. Even later strikes were worded 'J CUT MY WAY THROUGH'.

References 

The Guidebook & Catalogue of British Commonwealth Coins 1649.1971 3rd Edition by Jerome Remick, Somer James, Anthony Dowle, and Patrick Finn.
A Guide Book of United States Coins 53rd edition by R. S. Yeoman and edited by Kenneth Bressett. (2000)

External links
 Higley Coppers 1737, 1739, University of Notre Dame (with photos)

See also 

 Coins of British America

Simsbury, Connecticut
Connecticut Colony
Token coins